Nişantaşı University is a private, non-profit educational institution, founded in 2012 and located in Istanbul, Turkey. The university is supported financially by the Nişantaşı Education and Culture Foundation. It started education in the academic term 2010-11.

Structure

Faculties 
Faculty of Economics, Administration and Social Science
 Civil Air Transport Management
 Psychology
 International Trade and Logistics
 Health Management
 Social Work
 Economics and Finance
 Political Science and Public Administration
 Economy
 Banking and Finance
 International Relations
 Business Administration
 Accounting and Financial Management
 Psychology (in English)
 New Media
 New Media (in English)
 Journalism
 Public Relations and Advertising
 Sociology
 Tourism Management
 Management Information Systems

Faculty of Engineering and Architecture
 Civil Engineering
 Architecture
 Software Engineering
 Computer Engineering
 Industrial Engineering
 Mechanical Engineering

Faculty of Arts and Design
 Textile and Fashion Design
 Interior Architecture
 Communication Design
 Radio, Television and Film
 Gastronomy and Culinary Arts
 Graphic Design

Nişantaşı University Vocational School

Campus
 Kağıthane Sadabad Campus in Kağıthane
 Bayrampaşa Campus in Bayrampaşa
 Nişantaşı Campus in Nişantaşı

References

External links
 Official website

Universities and colleges in Istanbul
Educational institutions established in 2012
Private universities and colleges in Turkey
2012 establishments in Turkey
Şişli
Bayrampaşa